
The Balloon Observer's Badge was a military decoration of Nazi Germany during World War II. It was awarded to German Army personnel who operated gas balloons flying them - above the ground. The balloons were easy targets for Allied pilots and ground fire. Due to its late introduction, only a very small number of badges were awarded. 

The die-struck badge features a laurel wreath of oak leaves and acorns surmounted by the national eagle grasping a swastika. Below this is a representation of an observation balloon. The Balloon Observer's Badge had three grades based on a point system: Bronze (20 points); Silver (45 points) and Gold (75 points).

Points were awarded for particular conditions, such as the difficulty and success of a mission. There is no record of the gold version ever being awarded. Recommendation for the award was rendered by a commanding officer of either the observer unit, artillery unit or army unit.

Notes

References 

Military awards and decorations of Nazi Germany
Awards established in 1944